The Secret Life of Bees is a 2008 American drama film adapted from the 2001 novel of the same name by Sue Monk Kidd. Starring Queen Latifah, Dakota Fanning, Jennifer Hudson, Alicia Keys, Sophie Okonedo, and Paul Bettany, the film was directed by Gina Prince-Bythewood and produced by Lauren Shuler Donner and Will Smith, with Jada Pinkett Smith as the executive producer.

The Secret Life of Bees is noted for Queen Latifah's critically acclaimed performance as August Boatwright. The film was released in the United States on October 17, 2008, and in the United Kingdom on December 5, 2008.

Plot
In 1964 South Carolina, Lily lives on a peach orchard with her abusive, widowed father T. Ray. 10 years earlier, the four-year-old Lily accidentally shot her mother as she was attempting to leave T. Ray. In the present day, her 14th birthday is approaching, and she celebrates the signing of the Civil Rights Act with her father’s Black hired help, Rosaleen. On the night before her birthday, Lily sneaks away into a nearby cornfield where she has secretly buried a few mementos of her mother, including a jar labeled “Black Madonna Honey, Tiburon, SC.” She places the picture of her mother on her stomach to feel closer to her as she lays back in the cornfield. She suddenly hears T. Ray calling for her and quickly buries her mothers belongings and tries to quickly button her shirt. She is caught hastily buttoning her shirt by T. Ray who assumes she was out there with a boy and punishes her by having her kneel on a pile of grits for an hour.

On her birthday, Rosaleen takes Lily into town under the pretense of Lily getting measured for a bra, but also to give Rosaleen the opportunity to register to vote. The pair encounter a group of racists who beat Rosaleen after she stands her ground against their intimidation, and she is arrested. T. Ray retrieves Lily and takes her back home, but she runs away and breaks Rosaleen out of the hospital, where she’s being treated for her wounds while she awaits jail. They head for Tiburon, with Lily hoping to figure out more about her mother’s past.

It takes two days for Lily and Rosaleen to reach Tiburon and find their way to the home of August Boatwright and her sisters May and June. August has used her skills as a beekeeper to build a successful business. Despite the unlikeliness of Lily's lies about hers and Rosaleen’s circumstances, and June’s suspicions, August takes them in, agreeing to trade room and board for their labor. Lily becomes an apprentice beekeeper and later discovers May's “wailing wall”, tucked full of little notes about events that have distressed the brittle and sensitive May, as well as May’s twin sister April, who died in childhood. She also learns about August’s leadership of a small group of women who pray to the life-size statue of a Black Madonna in the Boatwright’s living room for guidance.

In time Lily grows close to Zach, the teenage son of one member in the prayer group and August's assistant beekeeper/godson. Lily and Zach try to watch a movie together, but when they disregard racial barriers, sitting together in the "colored" section, gets Zach kidnapped by a group of townspeople. June and August hide the news from May to try and protect her, but Zach's mother reveals the news to her accidentally. Out of grief, May drowns herself to escape the pain of feeling the world's hatred, though in her suicide note she predicts Zach will be returned alive, and he is found the next day.

With May's funeral comes some reconciliation and truth. June agrees to wed her long-time boyfriend who she had previously repeatedly rejected. Rosaleen is asked to be part of the household family, and August says they will call her July. Lily, who already believes she killed her mother, now blames herself for Zach's kidnapping and May's death. She has a breakdown, convinced her mother didn’t want her, feeling unloved and unlovable, and resigns herself to leave before she causes any more harm. Before she’s able to go, August challenges her outlook, and tells Lily about her mother, whom August cared for as a child in Virginia and later sheltered from the abuse of T. Ray.

Meanwhile, T. Ray has figured out where Lily is by using a map she had pinned on her bedroom wall. He comes to Tiburon to take Lily home with him. However, Lily refuses to leave, and August, June, and Rosaleen form a phalanx of support. Lily confronts T. Ray about her mother, and he reveals he lied to her; her mother really did come back for her. With angry reluctance, T. Ray leaves her to be raised by the Boatwrights.

Cast
 Queen Latifah as August Boatwright
 Dakota Fanning as Lily Owens
 Jennifer Hudson as Rosaleen "July" Daise-Boatwright 
 Alicia Keys as June Boatwright
 Sophie Okonedo as May Boatwright
 Paul Bettany as T. Ray Owens, Lily's abusive father
 Hilarie Burton as Deborah Owens, Lily's mother
 Tristan Wilds as Zach Taylor, a friend of May, and Lily’s love interest
 Nate Parker as Neil, June's boyfriend
 Shondrella Avery as Greta Taylor, Zach's mother

Production
Early in the film's development, David Gordon Green was set to direct the film and Focus Features was going to distribute it.

Production began on January 7, 2008, in Lumberton, North Carolina, and Watha, North Carolina and ended a few months later. The film was screened in September 2008 at the 33rd Annual Toronto International Film Festival, and had an October 17, 2008, theatrical release.

Soundtrack
Original music for The Secret Life of Bees was produced by Mark Isham.

The film features the following songs:

 "Baby, I Need Your Loving" by Lamont Dozier, Brian Holland and Edward Holland, Jr.
 "Come See About Me" by Lamont Dozier, Brian Holland and Edward Holland, Jr.
 "Prelude (From The Unaccompanied Cello Suite No. 1 In G Major)" by Johann Sebastian Bach
 "Six Canonic Sonatas Op. 5" by Georg Philipp Telemann 
 "Sonata No. 3 In a Minor For Cello & Continuo: Allegro" by Antonio Vivaldi
 "The Honey Song" by Sue Monk Kidd
 "Beautiful" by India.Arie
 "Breakaway" by Irma Thomas
 "Come See About Me" by The Supremes
 "Doncha Know (Sky Is Blue)" by Alicia Keys
 "Heaven's My Home" by Sam & Ruby
 "Hippy Hippy Shake" by The Swinging Blue Jeans
 "I'm Alright" by Little Anthony and the Imperials
 "It's All Right" by The Impressions
 "Keep Marching" by Raphael Saadiq
 "Mary" by Joe Purdy
 "Song for Mia" by Lizz Wright

The soundtrack for the film was not released as a soundtrack album.

Reception

Critical response
Rotten Tomatoes reported the film has an approval of 59% based on 139 reviews, with an average rating of 5.94/10. The site's critics consensus reads: "The Secret Life of Bees has charm, but is largely too maudlin and sticky-sweet." Metacritic gives the film a weighted average score of 57 out of 100, based on 32 critics, indicating "mixed or average reviews". Audiences polled by CinemaScore gave the film an average grade of "A" on an A+ to F scale.

Writing in The New York Times, reviewer A. O. Scott thought the film to be "a familiar and tired fable". Roger Ebert found the film "enchanting" and gave it 3.5/4 stars.

Box office
The film was  3 at the North American box office for its opening weekend with $10.5 million. It later went on to gross $40 million worldwide.

Accolades
The movie won the awards for "Favorite Movie Drama" and "Favorite Independent Movie" at the 35th People's Choice Awards.

The film received seven NAACP Image Award nominations, which include Outstanding Motion Picture, Outstanding Actress in a Motion Picture (Queen Latifah, Dakota Fanning), Outstanding Actor in a Motion Picture (Nate Parker), and Outstanding Supporting Actress in a Motion Picture (Alicia Keys, Jennifer Hudson, and Sophie Okonedo). The movie won the Image Award for Outstanding Motion Picture.

References

External links
 
 
 

2008 films
2000s coming-of-age drama films
African-American drama films
American coming-of-age drama films
2000s English-language films
Films about domestic violence
Films about race and ethnicity
Films about sisters
Films directed by Gina Prince-Bythewood
Films produced by Will Smith
Films produced by Lauren Shuler Donner
Films set in the 1960s
Films set in 1964
Films about child abuse
Films about bullying
Films about dysfunctional families
Films shot in North Carolina
Overbrook Entertainment films
Fox Searchlight Pictures films
Dune Entertainment films
Films based on American novels
Films set in South Carolina
Films scored by Mark Isham
2008 drama films
2000s American films